The list of Satellaview broadcasts is organized by genre (game, magazine, or data broadcast) and then alphabetically by broadcast title. Because the Satellaview was available only to the Japanese market, the official titles are Japanese and literal English translations are provided where possible.

This is intended as a complete list of all official St.GIGA broadcasts transmitted between April 23, 1995 and June 30, 2000 via the BS network to be received and unscrambled by subscribers to Nintendo's Satellaview service. The list encompasses data broadcast from the period of partnership between St.GIGA and Nintendo (April 1995 - April 1999) as well as the period of sole St.GIGA control (April 1999 - June 2000).

Because many Satellaview broadcasts were episodic in nature, individual broadcast titles often took a standard "Dai-Shuu" form which indicated to the player the episode number in terms of weeks (for example, "Game Title 第X週", where "X" represents the week number). Other Satellaview broadcasts bore titles that more directly reflected the exact date of the broadcast. This was common, for example, with the Nintendo Power magazine broadcasts. To reduce repetition, this list displays the name of the broadcast and the number of weeks during which unique episodes were broadcast (including the dates of first broadcast); however dates and "Dai-Shuu" constructions have been removed to allow a single listing for the item.

Numerous non-SoundLink Satellaview broadcasts were originally or simultaneously released for the Super Famicom.

Broadcast game list

Broadcast data list

Broadcast magazine list

See also
Satellaview games from The Legend of Zelda series

References

Satellaview
Satellaview
Super Nintendo Entertainment System
Satellaview